Vitula edmandsii, the American wax moth,  dried-fruit moth or dried fruit moth, is a species of snout moth in the genus Vitula. It shares its common name with Cadra calidella, another dried fruit moth. It was described by Packard in 1865. It is found in Germany, Denmark and Fennoscandia, as well Great Britain and eastern North America. The beehive honey moth (ssp. serratilineella), which is found in western North America, is either treated as a full species or as a subspecies of Vitula edmandsii.

The wingspan is 20–25 mm.

Subspecies
Vitula edmandsii edmandsii – dried fruit moth (Europe, eastern North America)
Vitula edmandsii serratilineella (Ragonot, 1887) – beehive honey moth (British Columbia, Washington, Utah, California, Arizona, Texas)

Gallery

References

External links
lepiforum.de

Moths described in 1865
Phycitini
Moths of Europe